A mazār, also transliterated as mazaar, also known as darīh in the Maghreb, is a mausoleum or shrine in some places of the world, typically that of a saint or notable religious leader. Medieval Arabic texts may also use the words mašhad or maqām to denote the same concept.

Etymology
Mazār, plural mazārāt, is related to the word ziyāra (meaning "visitation"). It refers to a place and time of visiting. Arabic in origin, the word has been borrowed by Persian and Urdu. It has also been rendered as mazaar in English.
Darīh, plural adriha or dara'ih, is related to the verb daraha ( meaning "to inter"). It is commonly used in the Maghreb.

Specific types of shrines
Mashhad, plural mashāhid, usually refers to a structure holding the tomb of a holy figure, or a place where a religious visitation occurred. Related words are shāhid (‘witness’) and shahīd (‘martyr’). A mashhad often had a dome over the place of the burial within the building. Some had a minaret.
Maqām, plural maqāmāt, literally "a place of the feet", referring to where one stays or resides, is often used for Ahl al-Bayt shrines. According to Ibn Taymiyya, the maqāmāt are the places where the revered person lived, died or worshiped, and the mashāhidd are buildings over the maqāmāt or over relics of the person.

Regional terms for equivalent structures
Mazār is the Arabic word borrowed by Persian and Urdu. It is thus largely used in Iran and other countries influenced by Persian culture, in Afghanistan, Pakistan and India.
Weli (plural awliya): in Palestine, weli is the common term both for a saint and his sanctuary. A prophet's weli is called a hadrah, a common saint's is a maqam and a famous saint has a mashhad. 19th- to early 20th-century Western literature has adopted the word "wali", sometimes written "weli", "welli", etc., with the meaning of a "tomb or mausoleum of a holy man".
Qubba ( "dome", plural qubbat): in Sudan, the tomb of a holy man. Sudanese folk Islam holds that the holy man is sharing his baraka or blessings also after death through his grave, which is the repository for his baraka and thus becomes a place of ziyara ziyarat or visitation. A holy man worthy of such a shrine is called in Sudan a wali, faki, or shaykh.
 In northwest China, mazar is also translated phonetically as mázhā. It is also often referred to as a gǒngběi, derived from the Persian word "gonbad" meaning "dome". It is often a shrine complex centered on a grave of a Sufi master of the Hui people. 
 In Iran and South Asia, a dargah is a Sufi Islamic shrine built over the grave of a revered religious figure.
 In South Africa (especially the Western Cape), a kramat is the grave of a spiritual leader or auliya, sometimes inside a rectangular building that functions also as a shrine for the deceased (often a Cape Malay).
 In Indonesia, the terms makam and kuburan refer to graves of early missionaries, notably the Wali Songo saints of Java.
 In the Malay language, keramat refers to an object or person believed to be sacred or blessed, for example the tomb of a Muslim saint. See also Datuk Keramat.

Related terms
Masjid, plural masājid, means a place of prostration or prayer, and is often used by Shi'a for shrines to which mosques have been attached.
Darīh, plural adriha, is a trench in the middle of the grave, or the grave itself.

Origins

Practices vary considerably in different countries. Syncretism is not unusual, where pre-Islamic practices and beliefs persist among Muslim communities. Despite Muhammad's wishes and Allah's command, a cult of saints developed within some Muslim communities at an early date, following deeply ingrained pre-Islamic practices in the Middle East. Mashhads, or sanctuaries, were established by certain people for figures mentioned from the Quran, such as Muhammad, Jesus, the prophets, and other main figures of the Jewish and Christian Bible, great rulers, military leaders and clerics.

Opponents
The followers of Wahhabism consider that no person can mediate between man and God. They consider that Muslims who believe that saints and their shrines have holy properties are polytheists and heretics. In 1802, Wahhabi forces  partially destroyed the shrine of Imam Husayn. In 1925, the commander and later-king of Saudi Arabia, Abdulaziz Ibn Saud, destroyed the manmade structures in Jannat al-Baqīʿ in Medina, the burial place of four of the Shia imams and of Muhammad's daughter. The cemetery still exists, albeit in a much simpler form, and is used to bury the dead.

Design

There is no specific architectural type for mazārs, which vary greatly in size and elaboration. However, they all follow the conventional design of the turba, or tomb, and generally have a dome over a rectangular base.

Notable examples

In Iraq 
The Imam Husayn Shrine in Karbala, Iraq draws Shia pilgrims from Iraq, Iran and elsewhere.

The Sardāb of Caliph al-Mahdi ( 775–785) is preserved in Samarra, Iraq under a golden dome that was presented by Naser al-Din Shah Qajar and that was completed by Mozaffar ad-Din Shah Qajar in 1905. The tomb lies within the Al-Askari Mosque, one of the most important of Shia shrines.  The mosque was badly damaged in a February 2006 bombing, presumably the work of Sunni militants.

In Iran 
As of 2007, the Imam Reza shrine in Mashhad, Iran attracted 12 million visitors annually, second only to Mecca as a destination for Muslim pilgrims. This shrine is known for its healing powers.

The shrine of Princess Shahrbanu, just south of Tehran, is open only to women. Shahrbanu was the daughter of Yazdegerd III, the last Sassanid ruler of Persia. She married Imam Hussein ibn Ali and was mother of the fourth Shia imam, Ali ibn al-Husayn, so has come to symbolize the early and close connection between Shiism and Iran. The shrine is popular with women seeking solace or assistance.

In Syria 
The Sayyidah Zaynab Mosque, which holds the shrine of Zaynab bint Ali in Damascus, has been restored with the help of contributions from Shias from India, Pakistan, Iran and elsewhere. The shrine is one of the most important Shia sites in Syria, and draws many pilgrims from Iraq, Lebanon and Iran. In September 2008 a car bomb was detonated outside the shrine, killing 17.

In Aleppo, the Mashhad al-Husayn from the Ayyubid period is the most important of Syrian medieval buildings. The shrine of al-Husayn was built on a place indicated to a shepherd by a holy man who appeared to him in a dream, and was built by members of the local Shia community. The present building is a reconstruction: the original suffered severe damage in 1918 from a huge explosion, and for forty years lay in ruins. The original restoration largely succeeded in restoring the mashhad to its former appearance. Later additions included covering the courtyard with a steel frame canopy and adding a brightly decorated "shrine", which have given the monument a very different character from the original.

In Egypt 
In Egypt, many mashhads devoted to religious figures were built in Fatimid Cairo, mostly straightforward square structures with a dome. A few of the mausoleums at Aswan were more complex and included side rooms. Most of the Fatimid mausoleums have either been destroyed or have been greatly altered through later renovations. The Mashad al-Juyushi, also called Mashad Badr al-Jamali, is an exception.  This building has a prayer hall covered with cross-vaults, with a dome resting on squinches over the area in front of the mihrab. It has a courtyard with a tall square minaret. It is not clear whom the mashhad commemorates.

Two other important mashads from the Fatimid era in Cairo are those of Sayyida Ruqayya and of Yayha al-Shabib, in the Fustat cemetery. Sayyida Ruqayya, a descendant of Ali, never visited Egypt, but the mashhad was built to commemorate her. It is similar to al-Juyushi, but with a larger, fluted dome and with an elegantly decorated mihrab.

In Pakistan 
Some shrines draw both Sunni and Shia pilgrims. One example is the shrine of Abdol-Ghazi Sahab in Karachi, said to be a relative of Ja'far al-Sadiq, the sixth imam. He had fled from the Abbasids in Baghdad to Sindh, where he was given refuge by a Hindu prince. The Shias venerate him as a member of the family of imams, while the Sunni simply see him as a person of great sanctity.

Another example is the Lahore shrine of Bibi Pak Daman, thought to be the place of burial of one of Ali's daughters and four other women of Muhammad's family. The famous Sufi saint of the Sunni branch of Islam, Sayyid Ali Hujwiri (died 1071), once meditated for forty days in this shrine.

In Uzbekistan 

Mausoleum of Sheihantaur in Tashkent, Uzbekistan

In Kyrgyzstan 
Manas Ordo Mausoleum of Manas in Talas Province, Kyrgyzstan

In Afghanistan 
Shrine of the Cloak in Kandahar, Afghanistan. It contains a cloak believed to have been worn by Muhammad.
Shrine of Ali in Mazar-i-Sharif, Afghanistan. One of the reputed burial places of Ali.

In China 
Afaq Khoja Mausoleum near Kashgar in Xinjiang, China, tomb of Muhammad Yūsuf and his son Afaq Khoja
Sultan Satuk Bughra Khan Mausoleum in Artush
Ordam Padishah shrine near Kashgar
Imam Asim Khan Mausoleum

In Egypt 
Aga Khan III Mausoleum in Aswan
Abu Al Hassan El-Shazly Mausoleum in Sheikh Shazly

In Sudan 
Mausoleum of the Mahdi in Omdurman
Mausoleum of Sheikh Hassan al-Nil in Omdurman

In Pakistan 
Shrine of Data Ganj Baksh near Bhati Gate, in Lahore's Walled City, Pakistan.
Mazar-e-Quaid, tomb of the founder of Pakistan, Muhammad Ali Jinnah, in Karachi, Pakistan.
Mazar of Sultan Bahu, the founder of Sarwari Qadri order in Garh Maharaja, in Lahore, Pakistan.

In India 
Dargah Nizamuddin, founder of Chisti Nizami order, in Delhi, India.
Laila Majnu Ki Mazar, near Anupgarh, Rajasthan, India. According to local legend, the couple Layla and Majnun died here.
Mausoleum of Fakhruddin Shaheed in Galiakot, Rajasthan, India.

In Bangladesh 
 
Shrine of Bayazid Bostami in Chittagong, Bangladesh
Shrine of Shaiykh Saiyed Razzaq Ali Gilani in a.k.khan, Chittagong, Bangladesh. 
Shrine of Shah Jalal in Sylhet, Bangladesh.

In Indonesia 
Imogiri in Java, mausoleum complex of the sultans of Mataram, Yogyakarta and Surakarta.

In Singapore 

 Keramat Iskandar Syah, at Fort Canning Hill, is believed to be the tomb of Raja Iskandar Shah a 14-century king of Singapore.

See also

References

Notes

Citations

Sources

 

Sufi shrines
Burial monuments and structures
Mausoleums
Place of ritual